Sergio Goretti (2 April 1929, Città di Castello - 22 June 2012,Assisi) was the Roman Catholic Bishop of Assisi-Nocera Umbra-Gualdo Tadino, Italy.

Career 
Ordained to the priesthood in 1953, Goretti was named bishop in 1980 and retired in 2005.

Notes

1929 births
2012 deaths
Bishops in Umbria
20th-century Italian Roman Catholic bishops
21st-century Italian Roman Catholic bishops